Caleb Makene (born 20 April 1996) is a New Zealand rugby union player who currently plays as an outside back or fly-half for  in New Zealand's domestic National Provincial Championship competition and Utah Warriors in the Major League Rugby (MLR).

Senior career

Born and raised in Napier, Makene attended and played rugby for Napier Boys' High School, captaining their first XV in 2014. After graduating high school, he headed south to attend Lincoln University in Christchurch and study environmental planning and management. While there, he was signed up by the  Academy and after 2 years in the Crusaders and Canterbury rugby structures,  he was loaned to the Tasman Mako for the 2016 Mitre 10 Cup. Two tries in nine appearances for the Mako helped them reach the final of the 2016 Premiership, in which ironically they were defeated by Makene's parent province, Canterbury.

While not initially named in their squad for the 2021 Super Rugby season, Makene was called into the  squad as cover for Vilimoni Koroi, who was training with the New Zealand Sevens team in preparation of the 2021 Olympics.

On 2 December 2021, Makene was named in the Utah Warriors squad for the 2022 Major League Rugby season.

International

Makene was a member of the New Zealand Under 20 side which competed in the 2016 Oceania Rugby Under 20 Championship as well as the 2016 World Rugby Under 20 Championship in England, making 5 appearances and scoring 6 tries.

References

External links
New Zealand Rugby History profile

1996 births
Living people
Ngāpuhi people
People educated at Napier Boys' High School
New Zealand rugby union players
Rugby union wings
Rugby union fullbacks
Rugby union fly-halves
Tasman rugby union players
Canterbury rugby union players
Hawke's Bay rugby union players
Highlanders (rugby union) players
Crusaders (rugby union) players
Utah Warriors players
Rugby union players from Napier, New Zealand